The 1992–93 Scottish Premier Division season ended in success for Rangers who won the title by nine points from nearest rivals Aberdeen and 13 points above third place rival Celtic to clinch five titles in a row. Falkirk and Airdrieonians finished 11th and 12th respectively and were relegated to the First Division.

Heart of Midlothian obtained a place in the UEFA Cup following the 1993 Polish football scandal.

Clubs

Stadia and locations

Managers

Managerial changes

League table

Results

Matches 1–22
During matches 1-22 each team plays every other team twice (home and away).

Matches 23–44
During matches 23-44 each team plays every other team twice (home and away).

See also
1992–93 in Scottish football
1992–93 Rangers F.C. season
Nine in a row

Scottish Premier Division seasons
Scot
1992–93 Scottish Football League